Marcel Heister (born 29 July 1992) is a German footballer who plays as a defender for Fehérvár in the Nemzeti Bajnokság I.

Career
A native of Gammertingen, he played for the local side before moving to the bigger SSV Reutlingen 05, where he remained until he moved, at the age of 18, to the youth side of TSG 1899 Hoffenheim. He stayed there for two seasons, playing for the U19 and the reserve sides, before moving on to Croatia.

He joined the Prva HNL side NK Zadar in the summer of 2012, and made his debut on 1 September 2012, in the 1–1 home draw with NK Istra 1961, coming in the 80th minute for Mario Bilen. After scoring an own goal in the 4–1 home win against HNK Cibalia, he scored his first Prva HNL goal on 22 February 2013 in the 2–1 away loss to NK Zagreb, in a match where he was subsequently sent off. An offensively-oriented player at first, his position was eventually to left-back, albeit an offensively-oriented one.

In the summer of 2014, he transferred to NK Istra 1961.

In July 2016 Heister signed for Beitar Jerusalem. He departed the club at the end of the 2017–18 season.

Ferencváros
In July 2018 he signed for Ferencvárosi TC.

On 16 June 2020, he became champion with Ferencváros by beating Budapest Honvéd FC at the Hidegkuti Nándor Stadion on the 30th match day of the 2019–20 Nemzeti Bajnokság I season.

On 29 September 2020, he was member of the Ferencváros team which qualified for the 2020–21 UEFA Champions League group stage after beating Molde FK on 3-3 aggregate (away goals) at the Groupama Aréna.

Personal life
Heister is of partial Croatian and Danube Swabian descent, and his paternal grandparents Josef Heister and Danica Marić moved along with his father Lukas to Germany from Cerna, Croatia.

Honours
Ferencváros
Nemzeti Bajnokság I: 2018–19, 2020–21, 2020–21

External links

Marcel Heister at Sportnet.hr

References

1992 births
Living people
German people of Croatian descent
Danube-Swabian people
Association football fullbacks
Association football wingers
German footballers
SSV Reutlingen 05 players
TSG 1899 Hoffenheim II players
NK Zadar players
NK Istra 1961 players
Beitar Jerusalem F.C. players
Ferencvárosi TC footballers
Fehérvár FC players
Croatian Football League players
Israeli Premier League players
Nemzeti Bajnokság I players
German expatriate sportspeople in Israel
German expatriate sportspeople in Hungary
Expatriate footballers in Israel
Expatriate footballers in Hungary
Footballers from Baden-Württemberg